is a railway station on the Chikuhō Main Line operated by JR Kyushu in Iizuka, Fukuoka Prefecture, Japan.

Lines

Station layout 
The station, which is unstaffed, consists of two staggered side platforms serving two tracks. A station building of modern concrete design houses a waiting room and an automatic ticket vending machine. There is a ramp up to the station building entrance from the access road but access to the opposite side platform is by means of a sheltered footbridge. A bike shed and parking lots for cars are provided outside the station.

Adjacent stations

History 
In the next phase of expansion, the track was further extended, with Iizuka becoming new southern terminus on 3 July 1893. On the same day, Namazuta was opened as an intermediate station on this new stretch of track. On 1 October 1897, the Chikuho Kogyo Railway, now renamed the Chikuho Railway, merged with the Kyushu Railway. After the Kyushu Railway was nationalized on 1 July 1907, Japanese Government Railways (JGR) took over control of the station. On 12 October 1909, the station became part of the Chikuho Main Line. With the privatization of Japanese National Railways (JNR), the successor of JGR, on 1 April 1987, control of the station passed to JR Kyushu.

Passenger statistics
In fiscal 2016, the station was used by an average of 389 passengers daily (boarding passengers only), and it ranked 274th among the busiest stations of JR Kyushu.

References

External links
Namazuta Station (JR Kyushu)

Railway stations in Fukuoka Prefecture
Railway stations in Japan opened in 1893